Kamienna  (German: Giesdorf) is a village in the administrative district of Gmina Namysłów, within Namysłów County, Opole Voivodeship, in south-western Poland.

The village has a population of 441.

References

Kamienna